Shanaqi-ye Olya (also Romanized as Shanāqī-ye ‘Olyā, also known as Shanāqī-ye Bālā) is a village in Qushkhaneh-ye Pain Rural District, Qushkhaneh District, Shirvan County, North Khorasan Province, Iran. At the 2006 census, its population was 151, from 33 families.

References 

Populated places in Shirvan County